Ilay Madmon  (or Madmoun, ; born 23 February 2003) is an Israeli professional footballer who plays as a center-midfielder for Israeli Premier League club Beitar Jerusalem and captains the Israel national under-19 team.

Early life
Madmon was born in moshav Ein HaBesor, Israel, to a family of Mizrahi Jewish (Yemeni-Jewish) and Sephardic Jewish descent. His father Moshe Madmoun hails from a local agricultural family who mainly specializes in growing tomatoes.

He also holds a Spanish passport, which eases the move to certain European football leagues.

Club career

Hapoel Beer Sheva 
Madmon made his senior debut with Israeli Premier League club Hapoel Be'er Sheva on 4 July 2020, as well as in the opening line-up against Hapoel Haifa, in a home match that ended in a 3–1 win for his team.

Madmon made his senior debut in the (2020–21) UEFA Europa League against German side Bayer Leverkusen on 26 November 2020, coming in as a 81' minute for substitute in a 1–4 away loss for his Israeli side.

International career 
Since 2021, he plays for as well as captains the Israel national under-19 team during the 2022 UEFA European Under-19 Championship first qualifiers and all its way to the Final against England U-19 on 1 July 2022. He also scored against Austria U-19 during the group stage. Thanks to that, the Israel U-19 has also qualified to the 2023 FIFA U-20 World Cup.

Career statistics

Club

Notes

Honours

Club 
Hapoel Be'er Sheva
State Cup: 2019–20
Super Cup: 2022

See also
List of Jewish footballers
List of Jews in sports
List of Israelis

External links 

 UEFA.com: 2022 Under-19 EURO Team of the Tournament, July 5, 2022

References

2003 births
Living people
Israeli Mizrahi Jews
Israeli Sephardi Jews
Israeli footballers
Spanish Jews
Spanish footballers
Citizens of Spain through descent
Hapoel Be'er Sheva F.C. players
Bnei Yehuda Tel Aviv F.C. players
Beitar Jerusalem F.C. players
Israeli Premier League players
Liga Leumit players
Footballers from Southern District (Israel)
Israeli people of Yemeni-Jewish descent
Israel youth international footballers
Association football midfielders